The Omaha Southern Railway was a subsidiary corporation owned by the Missouri Pacific Railroad Company. In 1891 the railroad bought a plot of land south of Plattsmouth, Nebraska that caused speculation in the town about the location of a railyard there. The railroad was also subject to a period study of subsidies it received from local and state governments.

See also

 Omaha and Southern Interurban Railway
 History of Nebraska

References

Railway lines in Omaha, Nebraska
Missouri Pacific Railroad
Defunct Nebraska railroads